WeatherNation TV is an American television network owned by WeatherNation, Inc., which features mainly local, regional, and national weather forecasts. The following article is a list of current and former affiliates of the network, which primarily consist of digital subchannels.

In markets where WeatherNation TV is not available through an affiliation with a broadcast television station, the national feed of the network is distributed via television on select cable providers and satellite provider Dish Network, in addition to being streamed on WeatherNation's website and through internet-capable devices and digital media receivers.

Affiliates

Current affiliates

Former affiliates

References

WeatherNation TV